Thomas Prince may refer to: 
Thomas Prince (historian) (1687–1758), American clergyman, scholar and historian
 Thomas Prince (Leveller) (fl. 1630–1657)
 Thomas Prince (footballer) (1879–1950), English footballer
 Thomas Binkley Prince (1913–1969), creator of the Arizona roadside attraction The Thing?
 Thomas Prince (scientist), professor of physics at the California Institute of Technology
 Tommy Prince (Thomas George Prince 1915–1977), Indigenous Canadian war hero
 Tom Prince (baseball) (Thomas Albert Prince, born 1964), American baseball player
 Tom Prince (bodybuilder) (1969–2022), American professional bodybuilder